Francesco Chiesa (born 25 September 1931) is a Swiss former footballer who played as a midfielder. He made nine appearances for the Switzerland national team from 1952 to 1960.

References

External links
 

1931 births
Living people
Swiss men's footballers
Association football midfielders
Switzerland international footballers
FC Chiasso players
Place of birth missing (living people)